Model C may refer to:
 Model C, a semi-private structure used in the governance of whites-only government schools in South Africa
 Model C, a John Deere tractor model